Presicce was a town and comune in the Italian province of Lecce in the Apulia region of south-east Italy. In 2019 it was merged with the adjacent Acquarica del Capo to form Presicce-Acquarica. 

In 2022, facing a declining population, the town launched the program to reverse the trend and revitalize the town by offering €30,000 to people who are willing to purchase an empty structure and relocate to the old quarter.

Main sights
Ducal Palace, built by the Normans, perhaps on a pre-existing Byzantine structure
Church of Sant'Andrea Apostolo
Church of the Carmine and convent (mid-16th century)
Casa Turrita (16th century), an example of noble residence including a defensive tower.

Culture
Presicce appears in the 2014 British musical film, Walking on Sunshine.

References

Cities and towns in Apulia
Localities of Salento